Beiarn is a municipality in Nordland county, Norway. It is part of the traditional district of Salten. Beiarn is also a part of the Bodø Region, a statistical metropolitan region. The administrative centre of the municipality is the village of Moldjord. Other villages in Beiarn are Høyforsmoen, Trones, and Tverrvika.

The  municipality is the 88th largest by area out of the 356 municipalities in Norway. Beiarn is the 332nd most populous municipality in Norway with a population of 1,012.

General information
The municipality of Beiarn was established in 1853 when it was separated from the large municipality of Gildeskål. Initially, Beiarn had 1,164 residents. The municipal boundaries have not changed since that time.

Name
The municipality is named after Beiar Fjord (Old Norse: Beðir or Beðinn). The meaning of the name is not definitively known, but it may be related to the English word bed in the sense of a "river bed". The name was historically spelled Beieren.

Coat of arms
The coat of arms has been used in Beiarn since 1988. The blazon is "Vert, a pine tree uprooted Or". This means the arms have a green field (background) and the charge is a pine tree. The pine tree has a tincture of Or which means it is commonly colored yellow, but if it is made out of metal, then gold is used. The pine tree was chosen to symbolize the mighty pine forests for which Beiarn has historically been well-known. This is mentioned both by Petter Dass' "Nordlands Trompet" and in Lars Hess Bing's "Description of the Kingdom of Norway, the Isles of Iceland and the Faroe Islands, as well as Greenland". There are remains of giant pine trees that are likely over one thousand years old. The green color of the field was chosen to represent the lush green forests and the gold/yellow color was chosen because the forest is "worth its weight in gold" for the municipality. The arms were designed by Erik Gabrielsen, who was a cultural consultant in Beiarn municipality. In 1995, the municipality applied to have the arms formally approved for use by the National Archives of Norway, but they were not approved because it did not meet the heraldic standards for coats of arms in Norway. The National Archives told the municipality that they can use the unapproved arms in some circumstances, but they cannot be put on a flag, road sign, or public buildings.

Churches
The Church of Norway has one parish within the municipality of Beiarn. It is part of the Salten prosti (deanery) in the Diocese of Sør-Hålogaland.

The Savjord Stave Church was modeled after the Gol Stave Church.

Geography

The municipality of Beiarn is located just north of the Arctic Circle, along the Beiar River including the Beiar Valley and some surrounding areas in the Saltfjellet mountains. The river is one of the best salmon rivers in Northern Norway. There are several large lakes in Beiarn including Arstaddalsdammen, Litle Sokumvatnet, and Ramsgjelvatnet.

The Saltfjellet–Svartisen National Park is partially located in Beiarn. The world's most northern naturally occurring elm forest (Ulmus glabra) grows in the Arstadlia nature reserve, where the rich vegetation also includes orchids.

Government
All municipalities in Norway, including Beiarn, are responsible for primary education (through 10th grade), outpatient health services, senior citizen services, unemployment and other social services, zoning, economic development, and municipal roads. The municipality is governed by a municipal council of elected representatives, which in turn elect a mayor.  The municipality falls under the Salten District Court and the Hålogaland Court of Appeal.

Municipal council
The municipal council of Beiarn is made up of 15 representatives that are elected to four year terms. The party breakdown of the council is as follows:

Attractions
The area offers many outdoor activities to visitors, including fishing, caving, and mountain walking. The Beiarn farm museum includes an overview of Beiarn's cultural history, from the Viking Age through to the middle of the 20th century.

Notable people 
 Kristian Moljord (1882 in Beiarn – 1976) a fisherman, railroad worker, miner and politician

See also
Bearn

References

External links
Municipal fact sheet from Statistics Norway 

Beiarn municipality 
Elm in Norway 
Elm  
About Tvervik in Beiarn 

 
Municipalities of Nordland
Populated places of Arctic Norway
1853 establishments in Norway